Callochromis pleurospilus is a species of cichlid endemic to Lake Tanganyika excepting the southern end.  Its preferred habitat consists of sandy bottoms with nearby rocks.  This fish reaches a length of  TL.  It can also be found in the aquarium trade.

References

pleurospilus
Taxa named by George Albert Boulenger
Taxonomy articles created by Polbot
Fish described in 1906